Arabidopsis thaliana is a first class model organism and the single most important species
for fundamental research in plant molecular genetics.

A. thaliana was the first plant for which a high-quality reference genome sequence was determined (see below), and a worldwide research community has developed many other genetic resources and tools.
The experimental advantages of A. thaliana have enabled many important discoveries.
These advantages have been extensively reviewed,
as has its role in fundamental discoveries
about the plant immune system,
natural variation,
root biology,
and other areas.

Early history 

A. thaliana was first described by Johannes Thal, and later renamed in his honor.
(See the Taxonomy section of the main article.)
Friedrich Laibach outlined why A. thaliana might be a good experimental system in 1943
and collected a large number of natural accessions.
A. thaliana is largely self-pollinating, so these accessions represent  inbred strains,
with high homozygosity that simplifies genetic analysis.
Natural A. thaliana accessions are often referred to as “ecotypes”.
Laibach had earlier (1907) determined the A. thaliana chromosome number (5) as part of his PhD research.

George Rédei pioneered the use of A. thaliana for fundamental studies,
completing the first chemical mutagenesis screens
and writing an influential review in 1975.
Rédei distributed the standard laboratory accessions ‘Columbia-0’ and ‘Landsberg erecta’.

Gerhard Röbbelen organized the first International Arabidopsis Symposium in 1965.
Röbbelen also started the 'Arabidopsis Information Service', a newsletter for sharing information in the community.
This newsletter was maintained by A.R. Kranz starting in 1974, and was published until 1990.

Growing interest, 1975-1986 

As molecular biology methods progressed,
many investigators
sought to focus community effort
on a common model plant species
such as petunia or tomato.
This concept changed the emphasis
of the long tradition of researchers
using diverse agronomically important species
such as maize, barley, and peas.
Researchers in the laboratory
of Elliot Meyerowitz
showed that A. thaliana genome is relatively small and nonrepetitive,
which was an important advantage for early molecular methods.
Meyerowitz and colleagues also
made important contributions to development of the ABC model of flower development
via genetic analysis of floral homeotic mutants.
Meyerowitz and Chris R. Somerville were later awarded the Balzan Prize for their work developing A. thaliana as a model.
Notable researchers
such
Gerald Fink
and
Frederick M. Ausubel
were persuaded to adopt A. thaliana as a model,
including for the study of host-microbe interactions.
Pioneering A. thaliana studies have used its natural filamentous pathogen
Hyaloperonospora arabidopsidis,
the model plant-pathogenic bacterium Pseudomonas syringae, and many other microbes.

A. thaliana roots are transparent
and have a relatively simple radially symmetric cellular structure,
facilitating analysis by microscopy.

Molecular cloning, 1986-2000
Cloning of an A. thaliana gene, an alcohol dehydrogenase-encoding locus, was described in 1986.

Genetic maps, QTL populations, and map-based cloning
Development of a genetic map based on visible and molecular genetic markers facilitated map-based cloning of mutant loci from classical "forward genetic" screens.
Growing amounts of DNA sequence data
facilitated development and application of such molecular markers.
Descriptions of the first successful map-based cloning projects
were published in 1992.

Recombinant inbred strain/line (RIL) populations
were developed,
notably from a cross of Columbia-0 × Lansberg erecta,
and used to map and clone a wide variety of quantitative trait loci.

Efficient genetic transformation
A. thaliana can be genetically transformed using Agrobacterium tumefaciens; transformation was first reported in 1986.
Later work showed that transgenic seed can be obtained by simply dipping flowers into a suitable bacterial suspension. The invention/discovery of this 'floral dip' method, published in 1998, made A. thaliana arguably the most easily transformed multicellular organism, and has been essential to many subsequent investigations.
Efficient transformation facilitated insertional mutagenesis
as described further below.

Homeodomain genes 
The plant homeodomain finger is so named due to its discovery in an Arabidopsis homeodomain. In 1993 Schindler et al. discovered the PHD finger in the protein . It has since proven to be important to chromatin in a wide variety of taxa.

KNOTTED-like homeobox genes,
homologs of the maize KNOTTED1 gene that control shoot apical meristem identity,
were described in 1994
and cloning of the SHOOT-MERISTEMLESS locus
was published in 1996.

Genome project 
An international consortium began sequencing and assembly of a draft genome for A. thaliana in 1990. 
This work paralleled the Human Genome Project
and related projects for other model organisms,
including the budding yeast S. cerevisiae,
the nematode C. elegans,
and the fly Drosophila melanogaster,
which were published in 1996,
1998,
and 2000,
respectively.
The project built on efforts to sequence expressed sequence tags
from A. thaliana.
Descriptions of the sequences of chromosomes 4 and 2 were published in 1999,
and the project was completed in 2000.
This represented the first reference genome for a flowering plant and facilitated comparative genomics.

Functional and comparative genomics, 2000-2010 and beyond

NSF 2010 project 

A series of meetings led to an ambitious long-term NSF-funded initiative to determine the function of every A. thaliana gene by the year 2010.
The rationale for this project was to combine new high-throughput technologies with systematic gene-family-wide studies and community resources to accelerate progress beyond what was possible via piecemeal single-laboratory studies.

Microarray and transcriptome analysis 
DNA microarray technology
was rapidly adopted for A. thaliana research
and led to the development
of "atlases" of gene expression
in different tissues and under different conditions.

Large-scale “reverse genetic” analysis 
The A. thaliana genome sequence,
low-cost Sanger sequencing,
and ease of transformation
facilated genome-wide mutagenesis,
yielding collections
of sequence-indexed transposon mutant
and (especially) T-DNA mutant lines.
The ease and speed
of ordering mutant seed from stock centers
dramatically accelerated
"reverse genetic" study of many gene families;
the Arabidopsis Biological Resource Center
and the Nottingham Arabidopsis Stock Centre
were important in this regard,
and information on stock availability was integrated
into The Arabidopsis Information Resource database.

Syngenta developed and publicly shared a significant T-DNA mutant population,
the Syngenta Arabidopsis Insertion Library (SAIL) collection.
Industry investment in A. thaliana research
suffered a setback
in the closure of Syngenta's  Torrey Mesa Research Institute (TMRI), but remained robust.
Mendel Biotechnology
overexpressed the vast majority of A. thaliana transcription factors
to generate leads for genetic engineering.
Cereon Genomics,
a subsidiary of Monsanto,
sequenced the Landsberg erecta accession
(at lower coverage than the Col-0 project)
and shared the assembly,
along with other sequence marker data.

RNA silencing 
A. thaliana quickly became an important model for the study of plant small RNAs.
The  argonaute1 mutant, named for its resemblance to an Argonauta octopuses, was the namesake for the Argonaute protein family central to silencing.
Forward genetic screens focused on vegetative phase change uncovered many genes controlling small RNA biogenesis.
Multiple groups identified mutations in the DICER-LIKE1 gene (encoding the main DICER protein controlling microRNA biogenesis in plants) that cause strong developmental defects.
A. thaliana became an important model for RNA-directed DNA methylation (transcriptional silencing), partly because many A. thaliana methylation mutants are viable, which is not the case for several model animals (in which such mutations cause lethality).

Growing popularity of other model plants 

As the NSF 2010 project neared completion, there was a perceived decrease in funding agency interest in A. thaliana, evidenced by the cessation of USDA funding for A. thaliana research and the end of NSF funding for the  TAIR database. This trend coincided with the progress of the (US NSF-supported) National Plant Genome Initiative, which began in 1998
and put an increased emphasis on crops.
Draft genome sequence for  rice
were published in 2002
and followed by publications for sorghum
and maize
in 2009.
A draft genome of the model tree Populus trichocarpa was published in 2006.
The draft genome of Brachypodium distachyon,
a short-statured model grass (Poaceae)
was published in 2010.
The Joint Genome Institute of the United States Department of Energy identified poplar, sorghum, B. distachyon, model  C4 grass Setaria viridis (foxtail millet), model moss Physcomitrella patens, model alga Chlamydomonas reinhardtii, and soybean as its “flagship” species for plant genomics geared towards bioenergy applications.

Awards 
Nevertheless, A. thaliana remained a popular model, and 13 prominent American A. thaliana geneticists were selected as investigators of the prestigious Howard Hughes Medical Institute and Gordon and Betty Moore Foundation in 2011: Philip Benfey,
Dominique Bergmann,
Simon Chan,
Xuemei Chen,
Jeff Dangl,
Xinnian Dong,
Joseph R. Ecker,
Mark Estelle,
Sheng Yang He,
Robert A. Martienssen,
Elliot Meyerowitz,
Craig Pikaard,
and Keiko Torii.
(Also selected were wheat geneticist Jorge Dubcovsky and photosynthesis researcher Krishna Niyogi, who has extensively used A. thaliana along with the alga Chlamydomonas reinhardtii.)
Prior to this, a handful of A. thaliana geneticists had become HHMI investigators:
Joanne Chory (1997),
Daphne Preuss (2000-2006),
and Steve Jacobsen (2005).

Impact of second- and third-generation sequencing technology 
A. thaliana continues to be the subject of intense study using new technologies such as high-throughput sequencing.
Direct sequencing of cDNA (“RNA-Seq”)
largely replaced microarray analysis of gene expression,
and several studies sequenced cDNA from single cells (scRNA-seq), particularly from root tissue.
Mapping of mutations from forward screens
is increasingly done
with direct genome sequencing,
combined in some cases with bulked segregant analysis
or backcrossing.
A. thaliana is a premier model
for studies of the plant microbiome
and natural genetic variation,
including genome-wide association studies.
Short RNA-guided DNA editing with CRISPR tools has been applied to A. thaliana since at least 2013.

External links 
 Electronic Arabidopsis Information Service (AIS) archive
 Multinational Arabidopsis Steering Committee reports (1990 onward) and meeting minutes
 The Arabidopsis book online
 1001 Genomes Project site

References 

Arabidopsis thaliana
Molecular genetics